Afrosoma is a genus of beetles belonging to the family Histeridae.

The species of this genus are found in Southern Africa.

Species:

Afrosoma capense 
Afrosoma castanipes 
Afrosoma servulum

References

Histeridae